Aditya J. Patwardhan is an Indian origin film director, producer and scriptwriter from Jaipur, India.  He has representation with the Rough Diamond Productions of Julia Verdin. He is best known for his short film Red House by the Crossroads (2015) for which he won Best Short film Award at the Los Angeles Independent Film Festival Awards. and the film was also the part of the 2015 Cannes Short Film Corner (Cannes Court Metrage) Cannes Film Festival 2015. His popular music video "Katra Katra" is currently playing on MTV India in the Indie Pop category on national television in India.

Biography 
Aditya belongs to the lineage of the Patwardhan family of the Chitpavan community of Maharashtra. After completing Computer Engineering in 2011 from Jaipur, Rajasthan, Patwardhan started making short movies and songs for the Indian audience. Based in Los Angeles, filmmaker Aditya Patwardhan is known for a wide array of works, including documentaries, series pilots and short films. With a filmography that has been recognized internationally, his work has been showcased through prestigious mediums like the Cannes Film Festival, MTV, etc.

Filmography 
Director 
 Only Vanilla (Short) 2016  
 The Head of the Mouse TV serial 2016 
 Torn (TV Movie) 
 As Red as You (Short) 2016 
 Red Souls (Short) 2016 
 Last Will (Short) 2015 
 Eastern Shores of the Western World (Documentary) 2015 
 Rosethorn (Short) 2015  
 Singularity (Short) 2015 
 Red House by the Crossroads (Short) 2015
 Katra Katra: Music Video: song composed by Gaurav Bhatt (Short) 2015 
 Vandarg (Short) 2014 
 Mora Mann: Music Video: song composed by Gaurav Bhatt (Video short) 2013
 Kyu Jata Hai: Music Video: song composed by Gaurav Bhatt  (Video short) 2013 
 Society Black (Short) 2013

Presently he is working on one feature film and four short film including When Red is White, aka The Touch of Aurora with Brazilian actress Thaila Ayala in the lead role.

Awards 
2016 - Los Angeles Independent Film Festival Awards for best drama won for "Red house by the crossroads".
2016 - Best Dramatic Short Film at the DIY Film Festival, Los Angeles
2014 - Nominated : Festival De Cannes 2015 for "Red house by the crossroad.

References

External links
 
 
 
 
 

1989 births
Living people
Film directors from Los Angeles
American people of Marathi descent